Jonas Olsson (born 21 March 1990) is a Swedish footballer who most recently played for Degerfors IF as a defender.

References

External links

1990 births
Living people
Association football defenders
Degerfors IF players
Gefle IF players
Carlstad United BK players
Allsvenskan players
Superettan players
Ettan Fotboll players
Swedish footballers